WSEI (92.9 FM) is a radio station broadcasting a country music format. Licensed to Olney, Illinois, United States, the station serves South-East Illinois. WSEI is currently owned by Forcht Broadcasting. The station previously had the call letters WVLN-FM.

References

External links
 
 

SEI
Country radio stations in the United States